Manuel Ramirez may refer to:

 Manny Ramirez (born 1972), Major League Baseball player
 Manny Ramírez (American football) (born 1983), American football player
 Manuel Ramírez (athlete) (born 1957), Colombian Olympic sprinter
 Manuel Ramírez (Venezuelan baseball player) (born 1982), Venezuelan baseball player
 Manuel Ramírez (guitar maker), guitar maker who trained Domingo Esteso
 Manuel Ramírez (soccer), Chilean soccer player who played in the South American Championship 1926
 Manuel Ramírez Gómez, Colombian economist
Manuel Ramirez, character in Seize the Night (novel)